In the Church of England and other Anglican churches, a deanery synod is a synod convened by the Rural Dean (or Area Dean) and/or the Joint Lay Chair of the Deanery Synod, who is elected by the elected lay members. It consists of all clergy licensed to a benefice within the deanery, plus elected lay members. The Synodical Government Measure 1969 makes it a statutory body. It acts as an intermediary between the parochial church councils of each parish in its deanery and the synod of the diocese as a whole. In England its lay members also elect the deanery's lay representatives to its diocese's synod (every three years by either plurality or STV) and its diocese's members of the House of Laity in the General Synod of the Church of England, every five years by a system of Single Transferable Vote.

Anglicanism